Richard John Huxford (born 25 July 1969) is an English former professional footballer who made more than 200 appearances in the Football League and the Scottish Football League. His regular playing position was at right back, but he also played as a central defender or in midfield.

Playing career
Huxford was born in Scunthorpe, Lincolnshire. As a youngster he joined Scunthorpe United as an apprentice, but was released without being offered a full professional contract. He played non-league football for several years, for clubs including Matlock Town, Burton Albion – whose manager met Gresley Rovers' interest in Huxford with a demand for a transfer fee, despite suggesting the player would "have to improve a great deal" to find his way into Burton's long-term plans – Gainsborough Trinity, and Kettering Town, for whom he played 103 games in all competitions.

He moved into the Football League with Barnet in August 1992 in an exchange deal involving Dave Tomlinson. After 33 league games in the 1992–93 season as Barnet won the Division Three title, Huxford joined Division One (second tier) club Millwall on a free transfer. He played 36 games in all competitions in his first season, helping the club reach the play-offs, in which they lost to Derby County in the semifinal. During that season he also spent a month on loan at Birmingham City as cover for the injured Scott Hiley.

The following season, his Millwall career consisted of one three-minute substitute appearance before he went out on another month's loan, this time to Bradford City of Division Two. The loan was extended for a further two months, then in January 1995 Huxford signed for Bradford City on a permanent basis for a fee of £50,000. He contributed to the club's promotion to Division One via the play-offs, and was involved in the build-up to both goals in the play-off final against Notts County. His chances at Bradford were limited at the higher level, and after a brief spell on loan to Peterborough United, the club released him from his contract in January 1997 and he joined Burnley, initially on a short-term deal until the end of the season. His contract was extended, and new manager Chris Waddle put him in the starting eleven, but he soon fell out of favour, and was allowed to try his luck in the Scottish League, joining Dunfermline Athletic on loan.

Huxford made his Scottish Premier League debut on 15 February 1998 away at Celtic: Dunfermline lost 5–1. The move was made permanent at the end of the season, and he played fairly regularly in his first permanent season with the club, but in September 1999 cruciate ligament damage put an end to his Dunfermline career. Released at the end of the 1999–2000 season, Huxford signed a one-year contract with part-timers Alloa Athletic, newly promoted to the Scottish First Division. His season with Alloa was disrupted by injury, and he was one of numerous players released as the club were relegated. Partick Thistle offered a three-month deal at the start of the 2000–01 season, but when the club decided to go full-time, he made the switch to Berwick Rangers in order to continue his studies. Albeit as a late substitute, he was part of the Berwick team which held Rangers to a goalless draw in the Scottish Cup.

During the 2002–03 season, Huxford played for Cambridge City's reserve team on trial, and turned out for Ely City of the Eastern Counties League, while attending courses at a Christian college in Hertfordshire. Huxford made a return to league football in 2006 with Elgin City of the Scottish Third Division, initially as fitness coach, later making one appearance as a player.

After football
While playing as a semi-professional in Scotland, Huxford earned a masters degree in sports science from the University of Edinburgh. In 2005, he was appointed as a Sports Science Officer for the Scottish Institute of Sport. Huxford has also coached the youth teams of Manchester United and Crewe Alexandra, and the senior squad of American side Carolina RailHawks.

References

External links
League stats at Neil Brown's Post War English & Scottish Football League A–Z Player's Transfer Database

 (Elgin City)

1969 births
Living people
Sportspeople from Scunthorpe
English footballers
Association football fullbacks
Scunthorpe United F.C. players
Matlock Town F.C. players
Burton Albion F.C. players
Gainsborough Trinity F.C. players
Kettering Town F.C. players
Barnet F.C. players
Millwall F.C. players
Birmingham City F.C. players
Bradford City A.F.C. players
Peterborough United F.C. players
Burnley F.C. players
Dunfermline Athletic F.C. players
Alloa Athletic F.C. players
Partick Thistle F.C. players
Berwick Rangers F.C. players
Ely City F.C. players
Elgin City F.C. players
National League (English football) players
English Football League players
Scottish Premier League players
Scottish Football League players